Donald Harley McKillop (15 February 1928 – 19 December 2005) was an English actor who trained at RADA. Notable roles include Bert the Landlord in the Doctor Who fifth and final serial of the eighth season, The Dæmons in 1971, Jack in The Likely Lads, Bill in Rosie and as Sgt. McKechnie in the first series of the Scottish TV production Sutherland's Law, opposite Maev Alexander. He appeared in five episodes of Dr. Finlay's Casebook between 1964 and 1970. He also appeared in notable films such as The Breaking of Bumbo (1970), An American Werewolf in London (1981) and Walter (1982).

During the 1970s, between acting work, McKillop worked as a metalwork teacher at the Roger Manwood School in South-East London.

Filmography

References

External links

 Don McKillop/Donald McKillop at Theatricalia
 Don McKillop's Australian theatre credits at AusStage

English male television actors
1928 births
2005 deaths
People from Carlisle, Cumbria
Royal Shakespeare Company members
Alumni of RADA